Ibrahim Kemoh Sesay (or Sessay) is a Sierra Leonean politician from the ruling All People's Congress (APC) political party. He is Sierra Leone's former Minister of Transportation and Aviation and member of the Pan-African Parliament.

Biography 
Sesay is born in Port Loko, Port Loko District, a muslim and a member of the Temne ethnic group.

From 2002 on, he had served as a member of Parliament of Sierra Leone representing Port Loko District. Sesay easily won re-election in 2007 with 75.7% of the total vote in his district; he had defeated Munirr Sankoh of the Sierra Leone People's Party by nearly 9,000 votes. He was appointed Minister of Transportation by president Ernest Bai Koroma in October, 2007.

References

External links
State House Press Release 
 http://www.statehouse.gov.sl/test2/index.php?option=com_content&task=view&id=207&Itemid=1
 https://web.archive.org/web/20080118035856/http://news.sl/drwebsite/publish/article_20057203.shtml

Year of birth missing (living people)
Living people
Government ministers of Sierra Leone
Members of the Parliament of Sierra Leone
Members of the Pan-African Parliament from Sierra Leone
Temne people
All People's Congress politicians
Sierra Leonean Muslims
People from Port Loko District